The Forum de Mundo Imperial is an indoor arena with a capacity of 4000 people located in the port of Acapulco.

Design
The forum's design includes a facade lit by 4,000,985 LEDs capable of projecting 16.7 million color combinations, making it the largest LED installation in Latin America. The enclosure is equipped with the latest technology in sound and design and is specially shaped for optimal acoustics. It is also constructed so that the farthest seat is 35 feet away from the stage, and the closest is two meters. The forum is designed for public use, offering VIP boxes and suites as well as general seating. During its four years of operation, the forum has hosted thousands of visitors and artists such as Luis Miguel, Wisin y Yandel, Camila, Alejandro Fernandez, The Cranberries, Gloria Trevi, Paul Anka and Juan Luis Guerra. Additionally, it has hosted major events, including Premios TVyNovelas, Acafest and Premios Telehit.

See also
Acafest

References

External links
 Official website

Music venues in Mexico
Acapulco